James Sweeney may refer to:

 James Johnson Sweeney (1900–1986), museum curator
 James Joseph Sweeney (1898–1968), American, Roman Catholic Bishop
 James Sweeney (film editor) (1901–1957), American film editor
 James Sweeney (Medal of Honor) (1845–1931), Union Army soldier during the American Civil War
 James G. Sweeney (1877–1917), Nevada Attorney General and justice of the Supreme Court of Nevada
 James R. Sweeney II (born 1961), American attorney
 James M. Sweeney (fl. 1960s–2010s), healthcare entrepreneur
 James Monroe Sweeney or Monroe Sweeney (1892–1950), American professional baseball umpire

See also
Jim Sweeney (disambiguation)
John James Sweeney (born 1927), Pennsylvania politician